Lieutenant-Colonel Sir Charles Shelley, 5th Baronet,  (14 May 1838 – 20 July 1902) was a British Army officer and Hampshire landowner.

Shelley was born in 1838, the second son of John Shelley (1806–1866) by his wife Elizabeth Bowen (died 1889). His paternal grandfather was Sir Timothy Shelley, 2nd Baronet. On the death of a cousin, Sir Percy Florence Shelley, in 1889, his elder brother Edward Shelley (1827–1890) succeeded as 4th Baronet. Sir Edward died childless the following year, when Charles succeeded to the baronetcy.

He served in the Scots Guards from 1855 to 1871, when he retired as a lieutenant-colonel.

He lived at Avington park, near Winchester, which his father had purchased from the last Duke of Buckingham and Chandos, and was a well-known figure in Hampshire, where he was a Justice of the peace (JP). He died on 20 July 1902.

Family
Shelley married, in 1869, Lady Mary Jane Jemima Stopford (1851–1937), daughter of the 5th Earl of Courtown. They had nine children, including the 6th, 7th and 8th baronets.

References

1838 births
1902 deaths
Shelley baronets, of Castle Goring
Scots Guards officers
People from the City of Winchester